The 1951 Michigan Wolverines football team was an American football team that represented the University of Michigan in the 1951 Big Ten Conference football season. In its fourth year under head coach Bennie Oosterbaan, Michigan compiled a 4–5 record (4–2 against conference opponents), finished in fourth place in the Big Ten, and outscored opponents by a combined total of 135 to 122.

Left halfback/quarterback Bill Putich was the team captain, and fullback Don Peterson received the team's most valuable player award.

Halfback/safety Lowell Perry was selected by the Central Press Association as a second-team player on the 1951 College Football All-America Team. Three Michigan players received All-Big Ten honors: Lowell Perry (AP-1, UP-1); offensive tackle Tom Johnson (AP-1, UP-1); and linebacker Roger Zatkoff (AP-1).

The team's statistical leaders included Bill Putich with 390 passing yards, Don Peterson with 549 rushing yards, and Lowell Perry with 395 receiving yards.

Schedule

Season summary

Michigan State

On September 29, Michigan, ranked No. 17, lost to Michigan State, ranked No. 2, by a 25-0 score before a sellout crowd of 97,239 at Michigan Stadium in Ann Arbor. To that date, it was the most decisive victory for Michigan State in the history of the Michigan–Michigan State football rivalry.

The Spartans limited the Wolverines to 26 passing yards, a net loss of 23 rushing yards, and four first downs. The Detroit Free Press called it "as feeble an attack as any teaam in Michigan's proud football history ever displayed." The Spartans tallied 21 first downs, 249 rushing yards, 58 passing yards, and four touchdowns.

Stanford

Indiana

at Iowa

Minnesota

at Illinois

at Cornell

Northwestern

Ohio State

Statistical leaders
Michigan's individual statistical leaders for the 1951 season include those listed below.

Rushing

Passing

Receiving

Kickoff returns

Punt returns

Personnel

Letter winners
The following 36 players received varsity letters for their participation on the 1951 team. Players who started at least four games are shown with their names in bold.

 James T. Balog, 6'3", 210 pounds, sophomore, Wheaton, IL - tackle
 Bruce A. Bartholomew, 6'3", 200 pounds, junior, Detroit - tackle
 Richard A. Beison, 6'0", 200 pounds, sophomore, East Chicago, IN - guard
 Donald C. Bennett, 6'2", 195 pounds, sophomore, Chicago - center
 William E. Billings, 5'11", 180 pounds, junior, Flint, MI - quarterback
Wes Bradford, 5'6", 155 pounds, junior, Troy, OH – started 6 games at right halfback
 Robert W. Dingman, 6'0", 180 pounds, senior, Saginaw, MI - end
Donald R. Dugger, 5'10", 180 pounds, junior, Charleston, WV – started 5 games at defensive left guard, 1 game at offensive left guard
Merritt Green, 6'0", 180 pounds, junior, Toledo, OH – started 9 games at defensive left end
 Frank Howell, 5'8", 160 pounds, junior, Muskegon Heights, MI - running back
Tom Johnson, 6'2", 227 pounds, Muskegon Heights, MI – started 9 games at left tackle (offense and defense)
 Ray Thomas Kelsey, 6'2", 195 pounds, senior, Lakewood, OH - guard
Peter Kinyon, 5'11", 190 pounds, senior, Ann Arbor, MI – started 7 games at offensive left guard, 1 game at offensive right guard
 Eugene Knutson, 6'4", 210 pounds, sophomore, Beloit, WI - end
 Laurence LeClaire, 6'0", 190 pounds, junior, Anaconda, MT - fullback
 Robert Matheson, Detroit - guard
 Duncan McDonald, 6'0", 175 pounds, freshman, Flint, MI - quarterback
Don Oldham, 5'9", 166 pounds, junior, Indianapolis – started 7 games at defensive back, 1 game at left halfback
Dick O'Shaughnessy, 5'11", 190 pounds, sophomore, Seaford, NY – started 9 games at center
Russ Osterman, 5'11", 170 pounds, senior, Baraga, MI – started 9 games at defensive right end
Ben Pederson, 6'2", 215 pounds, junior, Marquette, MI – started 8 games at right tackle
Lowell Perry, 6'0", 178 pounds, junior, Ypsilanti, MI – started 8 games at offensive left end, 1 game at right halfback, 3 games at safety
Don Peterson, 5'11", 175 pounds, senior, Racine, MI – started 7 games at fullback
Fred Pickard, 6'2", 190 pounds, senior, Grand Rapids, MI – started 8 games at offensive right end
Bill Putich, 5'9", 170 pounds, senior, Cleveland, OH – started 6 games at left halfback, 2 games at quarterback, 6 games at safety
 Russell G. Rescorla, 6'0", 180 pounds, junior, Grand Haven, MI - fullback
 Leo Schlicht, 6'4", 210 pounds, freshman, Madison, WI - fullback
 Thad Stanford, 6'0", 170 pounds, sophomore, Midland, MI - end
Ralph Stribe, 6'1", 200 pounds, junior, Detroit – started 7 games at offensive right tackle
Robert Timm, 5'11", 185 pounds, junior, Toledo, OH – started 9 games at defensive right guard
David Tinkham, 5'10", 170 pounds, junior, East Grand Rapids, MI – started 9 games at defensive back, 2 games at left halfback
Ted Topor, 6'1", 215 pounds, junior, East Chicago, IN – started 7 games at quarterback, 8 games at linebacker
Thomas Witherspoon, 5'11", 177 pounds, junior, Detroit – started 1 game at fullback
Jim Wolter, 6'0", 190 pounds, senior, Ypsilanti, MI – started 8 games at offensive right guard, 1 game at offensive left guard
 Donald M. Zanfagna, 5'10", 175 pounds, sophomore, Providence, RI
Roger Zatkoff, 6'2", 210 pounds, junior, Hamtramck, MI – started 9 games at linebacker, 1 game at fullback

Coaching staff

Michigan's 1951 coaching, training, and support staff included the following persons.
Head coach: Bennie Oosterbaan
Assistant coaches: 
 Jack Blott - line coach
 George Ceithaml - backfield coach
 Cliff Keen - head wrestling coach and assistant football coach
 Ernest McCoy - head basketball coach and chief football scout
 Bill Orwig - end coach
 Don Robinson - junior varsity coach and scout
 Wally Weber - freshman coach
 J. T. White - assistant line coach
Trainer: Jim Hunt
Manager: Leon Stock

Awards and honors
Honors and awards for the 1951 season went to the following individuals.
Captain: Bill Putich
All-Americans: Lowell Perry (UP 3rd team, Central Press 2nd team), Tom Johnson (Chicago Tribune 1st-team)
All-Big Ten: Lowell Perry (AP and UP), Tom Johnson (AP and UP), Roger Zatkoff (UP)
Most Valuable Player: Don Peterson
Meyer Morton Award: Merritt Greene

References

Michigan
Michigan Wolverines football seasons
Michigan Wolverines football